Persol is an Italian eyewear brand specializing in the manufacturing of sunglasses and optical frames. The name is derived from the Italian per il sole,  meaning "for the sun". Formed in 1917 by Giuseppe Ratti, Persol originally catered to pilots and sports drivers. Presently, the company markets durable sports sunglasses. The company trademark is a silver arrow.

History

In 1917 Giuseppe Ratti, owner of Berry optical, started producing his first glasses and lenses for athletes and aviators.  The company developed a flexible stem, known as the patented Meflecto system, which was one of the first spring hinges for eyewear. Persol was introduced to the United States in 1962 and opened its first boutique on Rodeo Drive in Beverly Hills in 1991.

Technology
Currently all plastic Persol spectacles are made in Italy using cellulose acetate.

References

External links

Luxottica
Luxury brands
Manufacturing companies of Italy
Italian companies established in 1917
Manufacturing companies established in 1917
Eyewear brands of Italy
Altagamma members
Eyewear companies of Italy